The 1995–96 season, saw the Bracknell Bees compete in the British League Division One.

League standings

Benson & Hedges Cup - Group D

Playoff Group A

Results

External links 
 Official Bracknell Bees website

Bra